Aisin Gioro Yongzhang (永璋; 15 July 1735 – 26 August 1760) was the Qianlong Emperor's third son by Consort Chun.

Life 
Yongzhang was born in the Manor of Prince Bao on 15 July 1735 as the third son of Prince Bao of the First Rank, Hongli. His mother, Lady Su, held a title of mistress (庶福晋).

Yongzhang was not partucularily excellent in horse riding because of lung disease, typical for his sister and mother. Some sources claim that his mother suffered from hemoptysis. When Yongzhang was critically ill at the age of 15, Qianlong Emperor ordered lamas to pray for him. In 1748, he was tasked with overseeing the mourning of Empress Xiaoxianchun. Yongzhang was removed from the succession list together with his brother Yonghuang for his behavior during the funeral.

In 1759, the Imperial Noble Consort Chunhui fell sick in the Chengde Mountain Resort. Yongzhang brought his mother back to Beijing. He died a year later and was posthumously honoured with the title "Prince Xun of the Second Rank".

Family 
Although Yongzhang was married to lady Borjigin, daughter of Heshuo Princess Shushen and Guanyinbao, he was unable to have male heirs because his sole son died prematurely and his daughter had no rights to inherit the peerage because of her marriage. His lineage was continued by Yongxing's son Mianyi.

Primary Consort

 Primary consort, of the Khorchin Borjigin clan (嫡福晋)

Secondary Consort

 Secondary consort, of the Wanyan clan (侧福晋)
 First son (19 January 1756 – 14 February 1756)

 Secondary consort, of an unknown clan (侧福晋; d. 1759)
 Secondary consort, of the Gūwalgiya clan (侧福晋)
 Lady of the Second Rank (县君; 29 July 1755 – 24 March 1777), first daughter
 Married Danba Dorji, of the Harqin Ulanghaigimot clan

Family tree  of the descendants

References 

Qing dynasty imperial princes
Qianlong Emperor's sons
Prince Xun (循)
1735 births
1760 deaths